Air Algérie SpA is the flag carrier of Algeria, with its head office in the Immeuble El-Djazair in Algiers. With flights operating from Houari Boumedienne Airport, Air Algérie operates scheduled international services to 39 destinations in 28 countries in Europe, North America, Africa, Asia, and the Middle East, as well as domestic services to 32 airports. , Air Algérie was 100% owned by the government of Algeria.

Air Algérie is in the process of aligning its codeshare agreements, frequent flyer programs, and airport lounge agreements with each of the SkyTeam carriers in order to meet SkyTeam's membership application requirements. The company reported that they applied to join Star Alliance or SkyTeam and began working in partnership with Lufthansa.

History

Formation and early years 

In 1946, Compagnie Générale de Transports Aériens (CGTA) was established. It started flights between Algeria and Europe on a charter basis in 1947, but by the end of the decade scheduled flights serving Algiers, Basle, Bône, Geneva, Marseilles, Paris, Philippeville, and Toulouse were operated. Three 34-seater Bretagnes joined a fleet of seven DC-3s in 1952. Compagnie Air Transport (CAT), subsidiary of Air France, and Compagnie Générale Transatlantique, was formed in the late 1940s to connect Basle, Lyon, Marseilles, Paris, and Toulouse with Algiers, Constantine, and Oran. Seasonal London–Deauville, and –Le Touquet flights were also undertaken. Following the drop in traffic after 1951, a merging partner was under consideration.

Following merger, Air Algérie commenced seasonal services to Ajaccio, Clermont, Montpellier, and Perpignan. Furthermore, Switzerland was added to the regular schedule, a stop at Palma was performed on a weekly basis in partnership with Aviaco, and most of the trans-Mediterranean routes were operated in a pool agreement with Air France, with the French carrier flying 54% of these services, and the remainder was left for Air Algérie. Flights to the Cote d'Azur were added in the late 1950s.

Following delivery, the aircraft was deployed on the Algiers–Paris route. The type was also used to fly Paris–Bône and Paris–Oran services in the subsequent months. By , the aircraft park consisted of three Caravelles, three DC-3s, ten DC-4s, two Lockheed L-749 Constellations, and three Noratlases. The Caravelles were gradually deployed on the routes previously flown with the Constellations and the DC-4s, which were used for cargo services or sold.

Algerian independence

Two shipping companies, Compagnie Générale Transatlantique, and Compagnie de Navigation Mixte, were the owners of a majority stake (98%) in Air Algérie until Algeria gained its independence in 1962. Following independence, the Délégation Générale in Algeria and Air France took over a controlling interest. In , the government increased the participation in the airline to 57%. That month, a contract was signed for the acquisition of two Ilyushin Il-18s aimed at operating the Algiers–Moscow service. Air Algérie took delivery of just one of these aircraft, as the contract was later cancelled. The sole Il-18 in the fleet was used by the government. That year, four ex-Lufthansa Convair 440s were bought and converted to the 640 version. These aircraft came to replace the ageing DC-4s. Charter operations made up to 20% of the airline activities.

By , the government was the owner of 83% of the company; at this time, a Boeing 737-200, five Caravelles, four CV-640s, three DC-3s and one DC-4 were part of the fleet. In , three Fokker F27-400s were ordered for £2.5 million. In , with a second Boeing 737 pending delivery, two more aircraft of the type —one of them a convertible model— were ordered. That year, the government of Algeria boosted its participation in the carrier to 100% when it acquired the remaining 17.74% stake held by Air France. A new route to Karachi was inaugurated in 1975. In , four Boeing 727s were ordered in a deal worth  million.

By , Air Algérie had 5,621 employees and a fleet comprising 57 aircraft, including 14 Ag-Cats, six Boeing 727-200s, ten Boeing 737-200s, three Boeing 737-200Cs, one Boeing 747-200C, one Cherokee Six, two Convair CV-640s, one Douglas DC-8-63CF, one Nord 262 and 18 Queen Airs; at this time, the company offered international scheduled services to Belgium, Bulgaria, Czechoslovakia, Egypt, France, Germany, Italy, Yugoslavia, Libya, Romania, Spain, the UK, the USSR and Switzerland, among other countries, as well as an extensive domestic network. In , the carrier ordered three Lockheed L-100-30s; by late  the same year, the first of these aircraft was due to be delivered. In , a Boeing 727-200 and a Boeing 737-200 were acquired. Three Boeing 737-200s were ordered for  million in 1983. Air Algérie became Airbus' 48th customer when it placed an order for two Airbus A310s in 1984. That year, a subsidiary called Inter Air Services (IAS), an airline that flew domestic and regional services using Fokker F-27 aircraft, was formed. The IAS network was operated on Air Algéries's behalf, and at  included Adrar, Algiers, Bechar, Bordj B. Mokhtar, Djanet, El Golea, Ghardaia, Hassi Messaoud, Illizi, In Amenas, In Salah, Oran, Ouargla, Tamanrasset and Timimoun; by this time, Air Algérie had 6,788 employees. In 1989, the carrier ordered three Boeing 767-300s for  million.

The first Boeing 767-300 was handed over by the aircraft manufacturer in mid-1990. That year, the carrier entered a process of restructuring that would last until 1995, following years of losses that totalled  only for 1990, with debts rising to  million after a devaluation of the local currency. Restructuring seemingly bore fruit, as the company made a profit of  million in 1992.
 
Air Algérie and Sonatrach created Tassili Airlines in 1998; Air Algérie's 49% shareholding in this airline was handed over to Sonatrach in 2005.

Modernization of the company
Air Algérie became a limited company in 1997. In 2006 its capital amounted to 57 billion dinars (about 560 million euros).

The sales network comprises 150 agencies in Algeria and abroad, linked to the booking system and distributed through GDS to which Air Algérie has subscribed.
Air Algérie is a Joint Stock Company (J.S.C) the registered capital of which is 43.000.000.000,00 DA.

In , Air Algérie announced an investment of €400 million to renew its fleet, to be launched in 2011.

Corporate affairs

Ownership and subsidiaries

Air Algérie is a joint stock company, with the shares 100% owned by the Algerian state, .

The airline has the following main subsidiaries: 

 Technics Air Algérie
 Air Algérie Catering, with 2,000 employees, preparing the meals of all Air Algérie's flights departing from Algeria
 Air Algérie Cargo 
Air Algérie Handling

The airline also provides charter services in support of oil exploration, and the annual Hajj pilgrimage in Mecca.

Business trends
The airline is loss-making. Its full Annual Report does not seem to be published regularly; figures disclosed for Air Algérie for recent years are shown below (for years ending 31 December):

Key people
, Bakhouche Alleche is the chief executive officer of the company.

Corporate identity
The Air Algérie logo was created in 1966 in Algiers, and has never been changed or modified since then. On 21 June 2011, the company officially announced that the logo is a swallow. This bird is a national Algerian symbol.

Destinations

In , Air Algérie inaugurated the Algiers–Montreal route. , Air Algérie has a 46% market share on international routes; the airline was the leading operator for flights between Algeria and Spain, and six of ten of its international routes with highest seat availability served France.

, the carrier serves a domestic network that comprises 32 destinations within Algeria, including its hub at Houari Boumediene Airport, plus an international network that serve 43 more cities.

Codeshare agreements
Air Algerie has codeshare agreement with the following airlines:

Fleet

Recent developments and future plans

Ten Next Generation 737s—seven-800s and three-600s—were ordered in 1998 to replace the ageing Boeing 727-200s and Boeing 737-200s; the 737-600 commitment was later increased to include two more aircraft.

Five Airbus A330-200s were ordered in late 2003, along with nine ATR72-500ssix of them taken over from and order previously placed by Khalifa Airways. The former type would act as a replacement for the two Airbus A310s, a Boeing 747-200 and three Boeing 767-300s, while the latter would replace the seven-strong Fokker F27 fleet. Also in 2009, during the Dubai Airshow, Air Algérie announced the purchase of seven additional Boeing 737-800s. In , the fourth aircraft from this order became the  Boeing jetliner delivered to the company.

In , the airline announced an investment worth €600 million for the incorporation of eight aircraft, two of them freighters, between 2012 and 2016. In , unofficial announcements disclosed the airline has ordered three additional Airbus A330-200s, five additional Boeing 737-800s. It was also reported the carrier's intention of deploying the new A330s on new routes to Johannesburg, New York, Shanghai and São Paulo.

The airline launched in  a tender for the acquisition of 14 passenger and two cargo aircraft. In , three 68-seater ATR 72-600s were ordered, and a commitment for eight Boeing 737-800s, valued at  million at list prices, was signed with Boeing. The ATR order made Air Algérie the largest operator of the type within Africa. In  the same year,  Boeing 737-700Cs were ordered for  million.

Current fleet

The Air Algérie fleet consists of the following aircraft (as of August 2019):

Historical fleet 

So far, Air Algérie has operated the following aircraft types:

To cope with the increased passenger volume during the Hajj and Umrah pilgrimages, Air Algérie has repeatedly leased Boeing 747 jumbo jets: from Aer Lingus (1979, 1980), Middle East Airlines (1981), SAS (1982, 1983), Air France (1982, 1985, 1986) and Air Atlanta Icelandic (2000–2005).

Other aircraft types that were operated on short-term leases during the Hajj season included the Airbus A310-300 (2005–07, leased from Saga Airlines and Air Atlanta Icelandic), the Airbus A320-200 (2005, operated by Eagle Aviation France), the larger Airbus A330-300 (2004/05, leased from AWAS), Airbus A340-300 (2012, from AirAsia X), Boeing 757-200 (2004/05), Boeing 767-200 (2001/02 and 2004/05, leased from Air Atlanta Icelandic) and Boeing 777-200 (2003, operated by Khalifa Airways), as well as the Douglas DC-8 (from the mid-1970s throughout the 1980s, leased from Eagle Air, Icelandair, National Airlines, Trans International Airlines and World Airways), the Lockheed L-1011 TriStar (1989/90, leased from American Trans Air, Caledonian Airways and Eastern Airlines), and the McDonnell Douglas DC-10 (1977, from Laker Airways).

Cabins

Business Class 
The Business Class is offered on the Airbus A330-200, Boeing 737-800 and Boeing 737-600.

In the Airbus A330-200, seats recline up to 118°. An express drink is served shortly after takeoff. In the Boeing 737-800 and Boeing 737-600, there are reclining seats up to 118°, with an audio system.

Economy Class 
The Economy Class aircraft is at Airbus A330-200, Boeing 737-800, Boeing 737-600, ATR 72-500, ATR 72-600.

In the Airbus A330-200, reclining Seats 118°. Each seat includes an audio system.

In the Boeing 737-800 and Boeing 737-600, reclining seats 118°, with an audio system.

In the ATR 72-500, reclining seats 118°.

Accidents and incidents

Fatal
The Stampe was completely destroyed upon impact, killing the sole pilot on board. The impact and the propeller blades of the biplane tore open the cabin roof of the Caravelle, and both of its jet engines flamed out due to ingested debris but were restarted almost immediately, allowing for a safe landing. There was one fatality amongst the 32 passengers and 7 crew members of the Air Algérie flight, and the aircraft was later repaired.
 On 11 April 1967, an Air Algérie Douglas DC-4 (registered	7T-VAU), which was on a flight from Dar El Beïda Airport in Algiers to Tamanrasset Airport, crashed into a hill in the Sahara desert near Tamanrasset during landing approach, killing all 33 passengers and 6 crew members on board.
 On 26 July 1969 a fire broke out on board an Air Algérie Sud Aviation Caravelle (registered 7T-VAK), which likely had been caused by an electric malfunction. The aircraft was on a chartered passenger flight from Marseille to Biskra, and the pilots tried for an emergency landing at Oued Irara – Krim Belkacem Airport, but the plane was quickly engulfed by flames and crashed, killing all 30 passengers and 7 crew members.
 On 24 January 1979 at around 19:40 local time, an Air Algérie Aérospatiale N 262 (registered 7T-VSU) crashed 15 kilometres short of the runway of Boudghene Ben Ali Lotfi Airport, resulting in the death of 14 out of the 20 passengers on board. The three crew members survived the accident, which was blamed on the malfunction of an altimeter (as the approach was performed too low), coinciding with pilot error and fatigue.
 On 21 December 1994, a cargo-configured Boeing 737-200 operating Air Algérie Flight 702P from East Midlands Airport to Coventry Airport (both in England) on behalf of Phoenix Aviation crashed 1.7 kilometres short of the runway at the destination airport, killing the five crew members on board.
 On 6 March 2003 at 15:15 local time, Air Algérie Flight 6289, a Boeing 737-200 (registered 7T-VEZ) on a domestic flight from Tamanrasset to Algiers via Ghardaïa, crashed shortly after take-off from Aguenar – Hadj Bey Akhamok Airport because of an engine failure, killing 96 passengers and all 6 crew members on board. There was only one survivor.
 On 13 August 2006 at ca 20:15 local time, Air Algérie Flight 2208 (a Lockheed L-100 Hercules registered 7T-VHG) crashed near Piacenza in Italy, resulting in the death of the three crew members. The aircraft had been on a flight from Algiers to Frankfurt when a problem with the autopilot occurred, resulting in the pilots losing control of the plane.
On 24 July 2014, ATC controllers lost contact with Air Algérie Flight 5017, a McDonnell Douglas MD-83 leased from Swiftair, en route from Ouagadougou Airport in Ouagadougou, Burkina Faso to Houari Boumediene Airport in Algiers, Algeria, which was reported missing at 01:55 or 02:00 UTC near to Gao, Mali. The flight was carrying 112 passengers and 6 Spanish crew members. 54 of the passengers were French citizens. It was found crashed in northern Mali.

Non-fatal
 On 8 June 1949, the right main landing gear of an Air Algérie Douglas C-47 Skytrain (registered F-BCYO) collapsed upon landing at Lyon-Bron Airport, following a cargo flight from Algiers. During the crash landing, the aircraft was destroyed, but the three crew members survived.
 On 30 October 1951, an Air Algérie Sud-Ouest Bretagne (registered F-OAIY) caught fire and was subsequently destroyed at Paris-Orly Airport, following the sudden collapse of the right main landing gear during take-off run. All 30 passengers and 4 crew members on board could be saved.
 On 26 April 1962, shortly after the end of the Algerian War, a parked Air Algérie Lockheed Constellation (registered F-BAZE) was blown up at Maison Blanche Airport by OAS terrorists, a militant French far-right nationalist group strongly opposed to the independence of Algeria.
 On 23 September 1973, an Air Algérie Sud Aviation Caravelle (registered 7T-VAI) was damaged beyond repair in a landing accident at Algiers-Dar el Beida Airport.
 On 1 August 1989, an Air Algérie Lockheed L-100 Hercules cargo aircraft suffered a ground loop upon landing at Tamanrasset Airport following a flight from Algiers, resulting in the aircraft being damaged beyond repair.
 On 25 July 1991, the nosegear of an Air Algérie Fokker F27 Friendship (registered 7T-VRM) collapsed during a hard landing at In Guezzam Airport, damaging the aircraft beyond repair.
 On 2 August 1996, an Air Algérie Boeing 737-200 (registered 7T-VED) overran the runway at Tlemcen Airport in an attempt to abort the take-off for a scheduled flight to Algiers. There were no fatalities among the 100 passengers and 6 crew members on board, even though the aircraft was substantially damaged.
 Another runway overshot involving an Air Algérie Boeing 737-200 (this time 7T-VEH) occurred on 31 January 1999. Upon landing at Constantine Airfield in unusual snowy conditions following a flight from Paris, the aircraft was severely damaged when it overshot the runway and struck a heap of snow. There were no casualties among the 92 passengers and 7 crew members.
 On 18 March 2006 at 10:30 local time, the right main landing gear of an Air Algérie Boeing 737-600 (registered 7T-VJQ) collapsed upon landing in poor weather conditions at Seville Airport following a flight from Oran. Approximately 45 out of the 101 passengers and 6 crew members on board were injured.
 On 14 March 2008, an Air Algérie Boeing 737-800 (registered 7T-VKA) that was operating Flight 1143 from Paris to Sétif with 120 people on board suffered extensive damage during a hard landing at Ain Arnat Airport.

Hijackings
 On 31 August 1970, three passengers armed with pistols and molotov cocktails hijacked an Air Algérie Convair CV-640 on a scheduled domestic flight from Annaba to Algiers and demanded the pilots to head to Albania instead. During a fuel stop in Brindisi, eleven passengers were allowed to leave the aircraft. As the aircraft was denied landing permission by the Albanian authorities, it diverted to Dubrovnik in then Yugoslavia instead, where the perpetrators could be arrested.
 When an Air Algérie Boeing 737-200 landed at Houari Boumedienne Airport on 31 March 1991 (during the Algerian Civil War) following a scheduled passenger flight from Béchar, a passenger threatened to detonate a hand grenade and insisted on being allowed to have a political statement on live national television, concerning the planned national election. The demand was rejected, and the hijacker was persuaded to give up and set free the 53 other persons on board.
 A similar hijacking occurred on 13 November 1994 on board an Air Algérie Fokker F27 Friendship (registered 7T-VRK) during a flight from Algiers to Ouargla. The aircraft with 42 occupants was forced to divert to Palma de Mallorca Airport, where the three perpetrators surrendered.
 On 25 July 1996 at around 9:00 local time, an Air Algérie Boeing 767-300 with 232 persons on board was hijacked at Oran Es Sénia Airport by a man who demanded to be flown to the United States, rather than to Algiers where the aircraft had been scheduled to leave for. After more than four hours of negotiation he surrendered to the local authorities.
 On 19 January 2003, Air Algérie Flight 6025 from Constantine to Algiers was hijacked shortly after take-off by a man who demanded the pilots fly the Boeing 737-800 to North Korea. The flight continued to Algiers, though, where the perpetrator could be restrained by police forces storming the aircraft. None of the 24 other passengers and 6 crew members were injured.
 On 19 August 2003, an Air Algérie Boeing 737-800 was hijacked by a mentally-ill passenger right after take-off from Houari Boumedienne Airport, who threatened to blow up the aircraft when the crew would not divert to Geneva (rather than to Lille as the flight was scheduled to). The crew carried out an allegedly necessary fuel stop at Oran Es Sénia Airport, where the man could be arrested.

See also

List of airlines of Algeria
Transport in Algeria

Notes

References

Bibliography

External links 

 
Airlines of Algeria
Algerian brands
Arab Air Carriers Organization members
Airlines established in 1947
Government-owned airlines
Government-owned companies of Algeria
Companies based in Algiers
Companies of Algeria
1947 establishments in Algeria